Zenia Mertens (born 27 February 2001) is a Belgian footballer who plays as a defender and midfielder for OH Leuven and the Belgium national team.

International career
Mertens made her debut for the Belgium national team on 10 June 2021, coming on as a substitute for Chloë Vande Velde against Spain.

References

2001 births
Living people
Women's association football midfielders
Women's association football defenders
Belgian women's footballers
Belgium women's international footballers
Oud-Heverlee Leuven (women) players
Super League Vrouwenvoetbal players